Kevin Pannewitz (born 16 October 1991) is a German footballer who plays as a midfielder for FC Amed.

Club career

Youth career
Born in Berlin, Pannewitz began his career for hometown clubs MSV Normannia 08, 1. FC Lübars, Nordberliner SC and Frohnauer SC.

Professional career
After several seasons with Tennis Borussia Berlin, he joined FC Hansa Rostock in summer 2008.

On 10 June 2012, VfL Wolfsburg announced on their official website the signing of Kevin Pannewitz from Hansa Rostock on a two-year contract.

In May 2017 Pannewitz started training at 3. Liga side Carl Zeiss Jena in an attempt to return to professional football. In August he signed a two-year performance-related contract with the club after losing 30 kilos of body weight since January. In January 2019, he was dismissed by the club.

Later career
Almost nine months after being kicked out in Jena due to weight problems, German Kreisliga club SC Siemensstadt announced on 14 September 2019, that Pannewitz had made comeback in football and joined the club. However, before even playing for the club, less than one month after his arrival, he left the club again and joined FC Amed.

References

External links
 

1991 births
Living people
Footballers from Berlin
Association football midfielders
German footballers
FC Hansa Rostock players
VfL Wolfsburg players
Goslarer SC 08 players
FC Carl Zeiss Jena players
2. Bundesliga players
3. Liga players
VSG Altglienicke players